KVVA-FM (107.1 FM, "La Suavecita 107.1") is a radio station licensed to Apache Junction, Arizona, broadcasting a Spanish Adult Hits music format. The station serves the Phoenix area. The station, owned by Entravision Communications, was part of the "Super Estrella" satellite network until 2009. Its studios are located in Phoenix near Sky Harbor Airport, and the transmitter is located in Mesa.

History 
KSTM launched from Apache Junction on July 1, 1973. The station, the town's first, was built by Harold Harkins and sold to Beta Communications in 1980. Under Beta, it broadcast a rock format known as "The Storm".

Two years after buying KSTM, Beta acquired KIFN, Phoenix's heritage Spanish-language station, and relaunched it as KVVA. Five years later, Beta opted to jettison the rock format for Spanish-language adult contemporary as KVVA-FM; it was the first Spanish-language FM station in Phoenix since KNNN had exited the format in 1984.

Beta went bankrupt in 1996, and the AM and FM stations were auctioned separately; KVVA-FM was sold to Z-Spanish Radio Network. Four years later,  Entravision acquired KVVA-FM and KMJK (now KDVA) and combined the two into a simulcast for its "Radio Romántica" format. In 2005 they would flip to Super Estrella, as part of the Super Estrella Network programmed by Edgar Pineda from Los Angeles. In September 2008, the simulcast switched to Jose FM, a Spanish adult hits format; the current La Suavecita format was instituted in 2018.

In July 2020, after years of filings involving a nearby FM allotment to Aguila, Entravision was approved to move KVVA-FM's city of license from Apache Junction to Sun Lakes, in order to relocate the transmitter from Apache Junction to South Mountain and become a market-wide signal; at the same time, KDVA will move to 106.7 MHz.

References

External links
 

VVA-FM
VVA-FM
Entravision Communications stations
Regional Mexican radio stations in the United States
Adult hits radio stations in the United States
Radio stations established in 1973
1973 establishments in Arizona